Daniel Rroshi (born 24 April 1988) is an Albanian football player who most recently played as a midfielder for Besa Kavajë football club.

References

External links
 Profile - FSHF

1988 births
Living people
Footballers from Kavajë
Albanian footballers
Association football midfielders
KS Turbina Cërrik players
Besa Kavajë players
Kategoria Superiore players
Kategoria e Parë players